Tom Parac (born c. 1931) is a former American football player, coach, and college athletics administrator.  He served as the head football coach at Montana State University from 1968 to 1970, compiling a record of 9–20. Parac was the athletic director at Montana State from 1971 to 1985.  A native of Lewistown, Montana, Parac played college football as a quarterback at Montana State, where he also lettered in basketball and baseball.

Head coaching record

References

Year of birth missing (living people)
1930s births
Living people
American football quarterbacks
Montana State Bobcats athletic directors
Montana State Bobcats baseball players
Montana State Bobcats football coaches
Montana State Bobcats football players
Montana State Bobcats men's basketball players
People from Lewistown, Montana
Players of American football from Montana
American men's basketball players